Mark Maiorana (born November 8, 1956) is a former member of the Arizona House of Representatives. He served in the House from January 1999 through January 2003, serving district 8. After redistricting in 2002, heran for re-election in District 25, but lost in the Democrat primary to Manuel V. Alvarez and Bobby Lugo.

References

Democratic Party members of the Arizona House of Representatives
1956 births
Living people